Tatria skrjabini is a species of tapeworm in the family Amabiliidae.

It lives as a parasite in the intestines of the little grebe (Podiceps ruficollis).

References

Cestoda
Animal parasites of vertebrates
Animals described in 1948